Seraya or Serayah may refer to:

Seraya, historical building in Nazareth, Israel 
Seraya Shapshal (1873–1961), hakham and leader of the Crimean and then the Polish and Lithuanian Crimean Karaites (Karaim) community
Serayah McNeill (born 1995), American actress, model and singer also known by the mononym Serayah
Seraya Energy, licensed electricity retailer in Singapore

See also
Sarah (disambiguation)
Saraya (disambiguation)
Sarai (disambiguation) / or Serai / Saraj
Saray (disambiguation)
Sabina (disambiguation)
Sabrina (disambiguation)
Sarita (disambiguation)
Sariya (disambiguation)
Seraiah, a Hebrew name